John Marco is an American author of fantasy fiction. His work falls into two main series: Tyrants and Kings, and The Inhumans (which is often also called the Lukien/Bronze Knight series, in reference to the main character).

Biography
Marco was born and raised on Long Island, New York. He worked as a technical writer in the aviation, medical technology, software, and home security industries. In 1994, while employed as a technical writer for a computer software company, he began writing The Jackal of Nar, which was published in 1999.

Bibliography

Skylords 
Starfinder  (DAW Books|2009)

The Bronze Knight series 
The Eyes of God  (DAW Books|2001)
The Devil's Armor  (DAW Books|2003)
The Sword of Angels  (DAW Books|2005)
The Forever Knight (DAW Books|2013)

The Tyrants and Kings trilogy 
The Jackal of Nar  (Bantam Spectra|1999)
The Grand Design  (Bantam Spectra|2000)
The Saints of the Sword  (Bantam Spectra|2001)

External links
 Fantastic Fiction Author Page
 
 John Marco at sffworld.com - interviews, reviews and information about the author

Living people
Year of birth missing (living people)
People from Long Island
American male novelists
American fantasy writers
20th-century American novelists
20th-century American male writers
21st-century American novelists
21st-century American male writers